The International Bowl was a National Collegiate Athletic Association (NCAA) collegiate American football bowl game played in Toronto from 2007 through 2010. During its run, it was the only post-season bowl game played outside the United States, the first such game since the Bacardi Bowl, played in Cuba on January 1, 1937. The game pitted teams from the Big East and Mid-American Conferences, with the Big East winning all four match-ups.

History 
In 2004, a partnership led by the city of Toronto bid to host a bowl game in Toronto, to help the city recover from its loss of tourism dollars due to the 2003 SARS outbreak. The NCAA sanctioned the new Poinsettia Bowl in San Diego, instead; Toronto re-launched its bid in 2005 and was successful, playing its first game at the end of the 2006 season.

The bowl signed agreements with two Division I conferences to provide teams: The Big East Conference, a BCS conference, and the Mid-American Conference. Both conferences are composed of schools in the American Midwest and Northeast, with the exception of Big East school South Florida. One Big East member, Cincinnati, is a former member of the MAC (conversely, the MAC had one former Big East member during the game's tenure – Temple, who later rejoined the Big East).

The 2009 International Bowl was notable in that the Buffalo Bulls (champions of the Mid-American Conference) appeared in the first bowl game in the history of the school. The Bulls turned down their only other bowl invitation, the 1958 Tangerine Bowl, as the black players on the team were not going to be permitted to play.

After the bowl could not renew its contract with the BCS member Big East Conference, officials decided to cease the contest. It was hoped that the bowl could be revived later on, but the Big East's contract with the new Pinstripe Bowl complicated matters. The MAC's tie in was inherited by the Humanitarian Bowl.

In all four editions of the International Bowl, the Big East representative defeated the MAC representative, with only the first game decided by fewer than 18 points.

Venue 
The International Bowl was played at Rogers Centre. It was the first football game of significance to be played in Canada under American football rules since Simon Fraser University's football team left the National Association of Intercollegiate Athletics in 2001, and joined CIS, where Canadian universities play under Canadian football rules.

Trophy 

The winner of the International Bowl was presented with a trophy similar in design to the International Bowl logo.  A Canadian maple leaf formed the back of the trophy, with a small crystal football set offset to the right.  The name of the winning team was placed on a plaque attached to the lower part of the trophy.

Game results

MVPs

Most appearances

Television
ESPN carried the International Bowl across its family of networks for the entirety of the bowl's history. Since the game was in Canada, the network chose to use its Canadian-born commentators or ones that had some connection to Canadian football. Toronto native John Saunders called the game for its first three playings, while CFL Hall of Famer Doug Flutie was a color commentator three times and Nepean, Ontario native Jesse Palmer was there for two of the games. With the exception of the inaugural playing, a Canadian served as the sideline reporter; Ontario natives Stacey Dales and David Amber were part of the festivities.

Radio

Local Radio

Photo gallery

2007

2009

References

 
Defunct college football bowls
American football in Toronto